Hiroki Nanami (七海ひろき, Nanami Hiroki) is a Japanese actress, singer, voice actor, and former otokoyaku (male role) star of the Takarazuka Revue (2003–2019).

Troupe History 

 2003–2015, Cosmos Troupe
 2015–2019,  Star Troupe

Biography 
Unlike many Takarasiennes, Nanami Hiroki’s life pre-Takarazuka was not marked with an abundance of performing arts experience. Rather, with a brother two years older, from a young age she'd roleplay the heroes in stories and do other boys' things. She was class representative every year of elementary school, an honor student in whom the teachers placed great faith. 

In her 6th year of elementary school, she happened to catch Takarazuka Moon Troupe's "Gone with the Wind" on television. She fell immediately in love with the star, Amami Yuuki, and began collecting all the shows she appeared in on video and watching them on repeat. A year later, Nanami went to see Amami Yuuki live for the first time in "Me And My Girl," and made the decision that she wanted to enter Takarazuka.

Though she had no previous dance experience, after entering middle school, Nanami enrolled in a ballet class in Tokyo that her father found specifically for those aspiring to enter the Takarazuka Music School. Once a week, she commuted 5 hours round trip from her home in Ibaraki to attend. 

She entered a high-level high school and her parents gave her the ultimatum that she couldn't take the exam to enter the Takarazuka music school if her school grades slipped, so she worked hard on her studies and took her lessons simultaneously She passed the Takarazuka exam in her second year of high school on her second try.

Her stage name, "Nanami" takes one character from her real name ("Mi" from "海," "Sea"), combined with "Nana" ("七," "Seven") from the name of a character she liked from the anime "Tico of the Seven Seas." "Hiroki" (which can contain the character for "vast" in Japanese) comes from the vastness of the ocean.

After graduating from the Takarazuka music school, she made her onstage debut in 2003 in Moon troupe’s Takarazuka Floral Diaries/ Senor Don Juan. She was then assigned to Cosmos troupe, where she would stay until 2015. During her time in Cosmos troupe, she was given the opportunity to play many different background roles, and in 2009, she received her first and only shinjinkouen (young performers) lead role, Justin in Raindrops Fall on Roses. In 2011, she was cast in a female role, Natacha Rambova in Valentino- playing the wife to then-Top Star Oozora Yuuhi. In 2013, Nanami had her first true theatrical lead in a Western-themed musical titled The Wild Meets The Wild. Following this, she was cast as Scarlett O’Hara in Gone With the Wind. 

During her time in Cosmos troupe, Nanami was also offered a voice acting role in an anime, an uncommon occurrence for a current Takarazuka actress, and in 2014, she voiced the character of Uesugi Kenshin in Satelight’s Nobunaga the Fool. 

In 2015 Nanami was transferred from Cosmos troupe into Star troupe, where she would spend the rest of her time in Takarazuka. Through her time In Star troupe, Nanami progressed to playing larger roles, from the lead role of Takenaka Shigeharu in Strategist Takenaka Hanbei, to Shou Fu Kan in both the local productions and overseas tour of the stage adaptation of Thunderbolt Fantasy, a Taiwanese puppet drama. In 2019, Nanami decided to retire from the Takarazuka revue, stating that she had: “...decided I wanted to leave at the time when I could show my fans the best possible otokoyaku I could be."

Nanami Hiroki resigned from the Takarazuka revue on March 24th, 2019, after sixteen years as an actress with the company.

Post-Takarazuka career 
Three months after her retirement from the Takarazuka Revue, Nanami announced her signing with Andstir entertainment and the King Records music label.  

She made her post-Takarazuka artist debut with the release of her first mini album, 'Galaxy', and an accompanying one-man live show with a four-concert run in Tokyo and Osaka. At the same time, she announced her post-Takarazuka seiyuu debut as Shizuno in Satelight’s Somali and the Forest Spirit.  

On November 8, 2019, she was instated as a cultural ambassador for Ibaraki Prefecture.  

Her first theatrical performance post-Takarazuka was the titular role of Red, in Red and Bear, an original musical which ran from January 24, 2020, to February 2, 2020 at the Sunshine Theatre in Ikebukuro, Tokyo, Japan. 

In addition to her voiceover, theatrical, and musical work, Nanami has hosted weekly radio shows such as七つの海への大航海, (‘nanatsu no umi e no dai koukai’, A Voyage to the Seven Seas) on Tokyo FM, and a television program on the Takarazuka Revue’s television channel, Takarazuka Skystage. Her self-produced television program, ときめきタカラヅカSTYLE (‘Tokimeki Takarazuka Style’), originally slated for a limited eight-episode run, extended to twelve episodes and ended in September 2020.

In March 2021, Nanami announced her move to King Amusement Creative, a label shared by several well-known voice actors, including Hayashibara Megumi and Mizuki Nana, and a third musical album (FIVESTAR.)

Notable Roles in Takarazuka 

 Beside the Foggy Elbe / Estrellas, Tobias
 Thunderbolt Fantasy / Amazing Star☆Killer Rouge, Shāng Bù Huàn
 Another World / Killer Rouge, Kiroku
Om Shanti Om, Mukesh
The Scarlet Pimpernel, Maximilien Robespierre
 Strategist Takenaka Hanbei, Takenaka Shigeharu
Guys and Dolls, Benny Southstreet
Catch Me If You Can, Carl Hanratty
Top Hat, Horace Hardwick
The Rose of Versailles,  Oscar
Gone with the Wind, Scarlett O'Hara
 The Wild Meets the Wild, Benjamin Northbrook
Legend of the Galactic Heroes, Paul von Oberstein, Wolfgang Mittermeyer
 Valentino, Natacha Rambova
 Gin-chan's Love, Makoto
 The Second Life, Mark White

Notable shinjinkouen (young star) roles 

 Casablanca, Victor Laszlo
 Raindrops Fall on Roses, Justin
Phantom, Phantom's Follower

Notable post-Takarazuka works

Stage 

 Reiwa Senbonzakura ~ Yoshitsune to Benkei / Korokke Monomane, Yoshitsune

 Elizabeth 25th Anniversary Gala, Rudolf

 Road 59, Hyuuga Shion

 Touken Ranbu, Hosokawa Gracia

 Red and Bear, Red

Live musical performances 
 Summer Tour 2021
 Kingdom Online Summer Live 
 Adachi House Festival “~You&I Peace&Love~”
 One-man LIVE 773 “GALAXY”

Albums 
 FIVESTAR
 Kingdom
 Galaxy

Voice acting 
 Nobunaga the Fool (2014), Uesugi Kenshin
 Somali and the Forest Spirit (2020), Shizuno
 Oda Cinnamon Nobunaga (2020), Hideto Mitsu
  Uchi Tama!? ~Uchi no Tama Shirimasen ka?~ (2020), Kai (episode 7)
 Gibiate (2020), Ayame Hatonami
 Pretty Boy Detective Club (2021), Rei
 Yasuke (2021), Nikiita
 Kageki Shojo!! (2021), Sei Satomi
 Night Head 2041 (2021), Naoto Kirihara (young)
 Visual Prison (2021), Eve Louise
 Shaman King (2021), Hao Asakura
 Insect Land (2022), Theo
 RWBY: Ice Queendom (2022), Shion Zaiden
 Mashle (2023), Abyss Razor
 Helck (2023), Edil
 Pickles the Frog
 Jack Jeanne (Nintendo Switch), Tancho Midori
 Angelique Luminarise (Nintendo Switch), Noa
 Arctic Dogs (Japanese dub), Swifty

TV 

 Tokimeki Takarazuka Style

Books/other 

 N (photobook)
 恋って何ですか？ (essay compilation)
 Tokyo FM Radio Show: 七つの海への大航海
 .773 (photobook)
 TS ONE United Radio Show: ～☆でぃあれすと☆〜
 Takarazuka Personal Book volume 4- Nanami Hiroki



References 

Japanese voice actresses
People from Ibaraki Prefecture
Takarazuka Revue
Japanese musicians
Year of birth missing (living people)
Living people